The Quiet Times of a Rock and Roll Farm Boy is the second solo studio album by American country music artist Big Kenny, one-half of the duo Big & Rich. It was released on November 10, 2009, via Big Kenny's own Love Everybody label. The lead-off single, "Long After I'm Gone," has entered the Hot Country Songs chart and has become his first solo Top 40 on that chart.  It was followed in 2010 by Big Kenny's Love Everybody Traveling Musical Medicine Show Mix Tape, Vol. 1, which was released exclusively through BigKenny.TV and BigSouthMusic.com.  In 2011, a deluxe edition of Quiet Times was released on iTunes, featuring remixes, alternate versions, new transitions between tracks and a digital booklet.

Content
The album's first single release is "Long After I'm Gone," which Big Kenny wrote with Marc Beeson and Richie Supa. His first single release outside Big & Rich, this song has also become his first Top 40 country hit. Big Kenny wrote or co-wrote all ten tracks on the album.

Critical reception
In Billboard magazine, the album was described as "a thoughtful, often profound sojourn into musical independence." In his review of the track "Share The Love", Bill Friskics-Warren of The Washington Post said "As 'aw shucks' as some of it is, he's as sincere as he can be, and he imparts it all with such a pleasant, self-deprecating tenor that it's hard not to be warmed by the good vibes he's spreading." Bill Brotherton of Boston Herald gave the album a B+.

Stephen Thomas Erlewine of Allmusic gave the album one-and-a-half stars out of five, saying that it had "a stronger country bent" than his work in Big & Rich but adding that "it exists in a curious netherworld between genres, willfully eclectic without a unifying vision and lacking a focus given by hooks[…]unless you're on his wavelength — and can stomach his exaggerated crooning — it's a pretty alienating ride." Jonathan Keefe of Slant Magazine rated it three stars out of five, saying that it had "terrific, oddball flourishes" that "[mask] some of Kenny's more clichéd lyrical turns and thin vocals," but added that other songs showed stronger songwriting than Rich's Son of a Preacher Man album. Bobby Peacock gave a more favorable review on Roughstock, saying "The lyrics are lean and, while not terribly original, are far from cliché, and the constantly changing musical terrain only makes the whole album all the more engaging."

Track listing

Chart performance

References

2009 albums
Big Kenny albums
Albums produced by Paul Worley
Bigger Picture Music Group albums